Indeterminacy or underdeterminacy may refer to:

Law
 Indeterminacy debate in legal theory
 Underdeterminacy (law)

Linguistics
 Indeterminacy of translation
 Referential indeterminacy

Philosophy
Indeterminacy (philosophy)
Indeterminism, the belief that not all events are causally determined
Deterministic system (philosophy)
Underdetermination

Physics
Quantum indeterminacy
Uncertainty principle
Scientific determinism

Other
 Indeterminacy (literature) a literary term
 Indeterminacy in computation (disambiguation)
 Indeterminate system
 Aleatoric music and indeterminacy in music
 Statically indeterminate
 Underdetermined system
 In set theory and game theory, the opposite of determinacy
 In biology, indeterminate growth of an organism

See also 
Nondeterminism (disambiguation)
Determinism (disambiguation)
Indeterminate (disambiguation)